SS City of Oxford was a steam merchant ship built in 1926 by Swan, Hunter & Wigham Richardson Ltd., in Newcastle-upon-Tyne and sunk by a German submarine on 15 June 1942.  Measuring 2,759 gross register tons she entered service with the Ellerman and Papayanni subsidiary of Ellerman Lines, and served during the Second World War.

On her final voyage under Master Alfred Norbury, she was in "position No.54 in the convoy, being the last ship in the 5th column", part of Convoy HG 84 travelling from Lisbon to Garston, and had called at Gibraltar on 9 June to join with the 36th Escort Group under the command of Captain "Johnnie" Walker.  She was carrying two thousand tons of iron ore and three hundred tons of cork

Following a preliminary skirmish around 0400 hrs, Topp fired three torpedoes at the convoy between 0432 and 0434 hrs. City of Oxford was the second of two ships to be struck  the first being .

According to an oral history recounted by Cpt. "Johnnie" Walker, following Thursos sinking:

References 

World War II shipwrecks in the Atlantic Ocean
Ships sunk by German submarines in World War II
Steamships of the United Kingdom
World War II merchant ships of the United Kingdom
Ships of the Ellerman Lines
1926 ships
Maritime incidents in June 1942
Ships built on the River Tyne
Ships built by Swan Hunter